The Parizeau Affair (in French l'Affaire Parizeau) was a political controversy that occurred in Quebec during the 2003 Quebec general election campaign.

Description
On the day of the leaders' debate, Jean Charest, leader of the Parti libéral du Québec, was presented by his entourage with an article from the website of the Trois-Rivières newspaper Le Nouvelliste. It spoke of past Parti québécois leader Jacques Parizeau reiterating the controversial money and the ethnic vote statement of his 1995 referendum concession speech. Despite the nebulous aspect of this preliminary web article, Charest surprised Bernard Landry with it during the leaders' debate on live television. This resulted in a new controversy that ran for some days following the debate, and was said to have hurt Landry's campaign. A strategy of the PQ was to denounce Charest's act as an immoral attack on a person's reputation and dignity (Parizeau), since the conclusion that he had repeated his comments was seen as hasty and ultimately wrong, but the strategy arguably did not work well enough to counter the controversy. Meanwhile, Landry mentioned on several occasions during press conferences that Parizeau's comments in 1995 were unfortunate and that he (Landry) disagreed with them. The Parizeau Affair is thoroughly treated in the documentary À Hauteur d'homme.

See also
Sovereigntist events and strategies
Quebec sovereigntism

Political history of Quebec
2003 in Quebec